TIROS 2 (or TIROS-B) was a spin-stabilized meteorological satellite. It was the second in a series of Television Infrared Observation Satellites. It re-entered in May 2014.

Spacecraft 
Tiros-2 was an 18-sided right prism, 107 cm in diameter and 56 cm high, with 9,260 1 by 2 cm silicon solar cells covered the top and sides. Five small directly opposed pairs of solid-fuel thrusters maintained a spin of 8 to 12 rpm. For attitude control, the spacecraft used an infrared horizon sensor and an magnetic attitude control device, made of 250 cores of wire wound around the outer surface, which oriented the spin axis to a 1 to 2 degree accuracy. It also had a direction indicator for picture orientation.

The satellite had two independent television camera subsystems, one low-resolution and one high-resolution, for taking pictures of cloud cover. Each camera had a magnetic tape recorder for storing photographs while out of range of the ground station network. It also had a five-channel medium-resolution scanning radiometer and a two channel non-scanning low resolution radiometer for measuring radiation from the earth and atmosphere.

Launch 

TIROS 2 was launched on November 23, 1960 at 11:13:03 UTC, by a Thor-Delta rocket from Cape Canaveral, Florida. The spacecraft functioned nominally until January 22, 1962. The satellite orbited the Earth once every 98 minutes, at an inclination of 48.5°.

The spacecraft functioned nominally until January 22, 1961.

Instruments 
TIROS 2 added two infrared radiometers to TIROS 1 instruments, which allowed more analysis of frontal zones.

References

Weather satellites of the United States
Spacecraft launched in 1960
Spacecraft which reentered in 2014